The Guiana dolphin (Sotalia guianensis), also known as the estuarine dolphin or costero, is a dolphin found in the coastal waters to the north and east of South America, and east of Central America. It is a member of the oceanic dolphin family (Delphinidae). It can live in both saltwater and freshwater.

Etymology
During its 2008 Annual Meeting in Santiago, Chile, as proposed by Flores et al. (2008), the Scientific Committee of the International Whaling Commission (IWC) endorsed ‘Guiana dolphin’ as the common English name for (Sotalia guianensis) in its IWC List of Recognized Cetacean Species (LRCS). Furthermore, the common name "Guiana dolphin" has been suggested by Flores and colleagues.

Description
The Guiana dolphin (Sotalia guianensis) is frequently described as looking similar to the bottlenose dolphin. However, it is typically smaller, at only up to 2.1 m (6.9 ft) in length. The dolphin is coloured light to bluish grey on its back and sides. The ventral region is light grey. The dorsal fin is typically slightly hooked, with a triangular shape. The beak is well-defined and of moderate length.

Guiana dolphins are very inconspicuous, and they do not bow ride on boats and normally swim away from them.

Researchers have recently shown that the costero has an electroreceptive sense, and speculate this may also be the case for other odontocetes.

Taxonomy
Although described as species distinct from the tucuxi Sotalia fluviatilis by Pierre-Joseph van Bénéden in 1864, the costero Sotalia guianensis has subsequently been synonymized with Sotalia fluviatilis with the two species being treated as subspecies, or marine and freshwater varieties. The first to reassert differences between these two species was a three-dimensional morphometric study of Monteiro-Filho and colleagues. Subsequently, a molecular analysis by Cunha and colleagues unambiguously demonstrated that Sotalia guianensis was genetically differentiated from Sotalia fluviatilis. This finding was reiterated by Caballero and colleagues with a larger number of genes. The existence of two species has been generally accepted by the scientific community;.

Distribution
The costero is found close to estuaries, inlets and other protected shallow-water areas around the eastern and northern South American coast. It has been reported as far south as southern Brazil and north as far as Nicaragua. One report exists of an animal reaching Honduras.

34 survive in Guanabara Bay near Rio de Janeiro, down from 70 in 1995 and 400 in 1985.

Food and foraging 
More than 60 species of demersal and pelagic schooling fish have been reported as prey. Small fish of 8 in (20 cm) or less are preferred. Foraging may be carried out individually or in groups. Different dolphin communities may adopt their own foraging strategies based on local circumstances. One of the best studied groups herds fish onto beaches and half strands themselves for a few seconds while grabbing their prey.

Behaviour
This species forms small groups of about 2-10 individuals, occasionally up to 100, and swim in tight-knit groups, suggesting a highly developed social structure. They are quite active and may jump clear of the water (a behaviour known as breaching), somersault, spy-hop or tail-splash. They are unlikely, however, to approach boats. They feed on a wide variety of fish, shrimps and squid. Studies of growth layers suggest the species can live up to 30 years.

In December 2006, researchers from the Southern University of Chile and the Rural Federal University of Rio de Janeiro witnessed attempted infanticide by a group of costeros in Sepetiba Bay, Brazil. A group of six adults separated a mother from her calf, four then keeping her at bay by ramming her and hitting her with their flukes. The other two adults rammed the calf, held it under water, then threw it into the air and held it under water again. The mother was seen again in a few days, but not her calf. Since females become sexually receptive within a few days of losing a calf, and the group of attacking males were sexually interested in the female, it is possible that the infanticide occurred for this reason. Infanticide has been reported twice before in bottlenose dolphins but is thought to be generally uncommon among cetaceans.

Conservation
The costero is listed on Appendix II of the Convention on the Conservation of Migratory Species of Wild Animals (CMS). It is listed on Appendix II as it has an unfavourable conservation status or would benefit significantly from international co-operation organised by tailored agreements. As with all coastal cetaceans, the Guiana dolphin suffers from negative interactions with humans. Entanglement in gill nets, seine nets, and shrimp traps is responsible for the death of many animals each year. There is very limited gene flow between concentrations of this dolphin, and large stretches of coast contain no animals at all, so recovery from depletion of a local population may take time.

See also

List of cetaceans

References

External links
Whale and Dolphin Conservation Society (WDCS)

Electroreceptive animals
Mammals of South America
Mammals of the Caribbean
Mammals of Brazil
Mammals of Colombia
Mammals of Central America
Mammals of Venezuela
Mammals described in 1864
Marine fauna of South America
Oceanic dolphins